Silencing Machine is the sixth full-length album by black metal band Nachtmystium. It was released via Century Media Records in the United States on July 30, 2012.

Limited edition includes an additional bonus track "Ashes to Ashes". This track is a rerecorded version of the same track on the Nachtmystium's 2004 album Demise.

Track listing

LP release

Personnel
Nachtmystium
Blake Judd – vocals, guitar, synthesizer
Andrew "Aamonael" Markuszewski – vocals, guitar
Will Lindsay  – bass
Charlie Fell – drum, percussion
Sanford Parker – keyboard, synthesizer

Additional musicians
Matthias Vogels – guitar, synthesizer
Bruce Lamont, Chris Black, Matt McGoat – additional vocals

Technical personnel
Rebecca Clegg – artwork
Collin Jordan – mastering
Sanford Parker – mixing and engineering
Nachtmystium (Sanford Parker) – production
Christophe Szpajdel — logo

References

External links
Century Media Records

Nachtmystium albums
2012 albums
Century Media Records albums